Galle is a small lunar impact crater on the Mare Frigoris, to the north-northeast of the prominent crater Aristoteles. The formation is nearly circular, with a sharp-edged rim and little appearance of erosion. There are slight outward bulges in the rim to the north and northeast, but otherwise the formation is relatively symmetrical.

Satellite craters 

By convention these features are identified on lunar maps by placing the letter on the side of the crater midpoint that is closest to Galle.

See also 
 Galle (Martian crater)

References 

 
 
 
 
 
 
 
 
 
 
 
 

Impact craters on the Moon